Durubalic is a small family of Australian Aboriginal languages of Queensland.

Bowern (2011) lists five Durubalic languages:

Turrubal (Turubul) and Yagara (Jagara)
Jandai (Janday)
Nunukul (Nunungal, Moonjan)
Gowar (Guwar)

Dixon (2002) considers all but Guwar to be different dialects of the Yagara language.
Tony Jefferies (2011) links Gowar to the Bandjalangic languages rather than to Durubalic.

Pimpama seems to be related to Gowar, whether they are in turn related Durubalic or to the Bandjalangic languages.

Footnotes

References
Dixon, R.M.W. 2002. Australian Languages: Their Nature and Development. Cambridge University Press.
Bowern, Claire. 2011. How Many Languages Were Spoken in Australia?